This Is Mecolodics is an EP by the free jazz ensemble Universal Congress Of, released in 1988 by SST Records. The cover art is modeled after the 1961 album This Is Our Music by saxophonist Ornette Coleman, a key influence on bandleader Joe Baiza.

Accolades

Track listing

Personnel 
Adapted from the This Is Mecolodics liner notes.

Universal Congress Of
Joe Baiza – guitar
Ralph Gorodetsky – bass guitar
Jason Kahn – drums
Steve Moss – tenor saxophone

Additional musicians
Guy Bennett – trombone (3)
Lynn Johnston – tenor saxophone (3)
Production and additional personnel
Martin Lyon – photography
Vitus Mataré – production
Universal Congress Of – production

Release history

References

External links 
 

1988 EPs
SST Records EPs
Universal Congress Of albums